Calar Alto is the highest peak (2168 m over sea level) in the Sierra de Los Filabres, a mountain chain in Andalusia, Spain. It is also the highest peak in the said mountain range.

It hosts the Calar Alto astronomical observatory, which benefits
from two aspects of the climate in the region: the dry atmosphere reduces the restrictions that  atmospheric water vapor adds to the transmission characteristics of seeing through
the atmosphere (see also the article Tabernas Desert), and the low number of cloudy nights adds nicely
to the efficiency of observations through the year.

External links
Calar Alto Observatory Homepage
Estación de Observación de Calar Alto (EOCA)

Mountains of Andalusia
Geography of the Province of Almería
Penibaetic System
Two-thousanders of Spain